yahyel are a five-piece indie pop band from Tokyo, Japan. The band was formed by Ikegai, Shinoda and Sugimoto in 2015 and Yamada and Ooi joined the band in September, 2016.

History

2015: formation and Y 
In 2015, Ikegai, Shinoda and Sugimoto formed the band.  In May, 2015, they released their first EP Y, which was acclaimed by critics.

In January 2016, they toured in London and held a mini concert at Rough Trade. They released their second EP Fool / Midnight Run soon after their tour.

2016: smash hit of "Once" 
On July 8, 2016, their first single, "Once", was released. On September 28, 2016, "Once" was re-released with additional track "The Flare". The CD was mastered by Matt Colton and sold out soon after its release. In November, they released their debut album Flesh and Blood, which ranked at number 68 on the Billboard Japan Album Chart.

Discography

Albums

Studio albums

Extended plays

Singles

As lead artist

Promotional singles

References

Japanese alternative rock groups
Musical groups established in 2015
2015 establishments in Japan
Musical groups from Tokyo